In 2007 Centro Hebreo Sefaradi Synagogue was described as “…the only remaining institutional legacy of the Sephardic presence in Cuba.”  Construction originally began in 1957 and the synagogue was completed in 1960 with a 726-seat sanctuary.  The main sanctuary was later rented out to the Afro-Cuban band Síntesis for their rehearsals while weekly religious services were held in a small room next door.  As of 2010, the synagogue had eighty families constituting 320 members.  The majority of congregants were 60 or older. 

Centro Hebro is affiliated with the Conservative Jewish movement in the United States.  There is a small Holocaust memorial at the synagogue with quotations from José Martí.

References

The Sefaradi are the Jews in Spain before and after the expulsion.  http://www.madregot.com/Sefarad.htm

Conservative Judaism in North America
Conservative synagogues
Synagogues in Havana
Buildings and structures in Havana
Sephardi Conservative Judaism
Sephardi Jewish culture in the Caribbean
Sephardi synagogues
Spanish-Cuban culture